Henriette Sauret (after marriage, Sauret-Arnyvelde; 1890-1976) was a French feminist author, and feminist pacifist journalist. As a feminist literary critic, her comments were less favorable about other feminist pacifist books than other experienced reviewers.

Biography
Henriette Sauret was born in 1890. Her father was Général . Henriette married the journalist André Arnyvelde.

Her poetry was published in L'œil de veau.

She was also a member of the French Union for Women's Suffrage. She was referred to as a radical feminist when in 1919, she spoke about bobbed women's hair as "a gesture of independence; a personal endeavor".

Henriette Sauret died in 1976. Erik Satie dedicated his Observations d'un imbécile (Moi) to Sauret.

Selected works
 Je respire, 1913
 Les forces détournées, 1914-1917, 1918
 L'amour à la géhenne : poème, 1919
 Isadora Duncan, impératrice errante, 1928
 Le Laurier de la vallée, 1933
 Une apôtre sociale: Marie-Louise Bouglé, 1938
 Des Roses! Poésie d' Henriette Sauret

See also
 List of peace activists

Notes

References

1890 births
1976 deaths
French feminist writers
20th-century French journalists
French pacifists
French literary critics
20th-century French poets
French political writers
French suffragists